Joshua Duffy (born 24 June 2000) is an Australian road and track cyclist, who currently rides for UCI Continental team . He won a bronze medal in the team pursuit at the 2022 Commonwealth Games.

Major results

Track

2018
 3rd  Team pursuit, Oceanian Championships
2019
 1st  Team pursuit, Oceanian Championships
 2nd Kilometer, National Championships
2020
 National Championships
1st  Scratch
2nd Kilometer
2021
 National Championships
2nd Kilometer
3rd Scratch
3rd Omnium
2022
 Oceanian Championships
1st  Madison (with Conor Leahy)
1st  Team pursuit
3rd  Scratch
 National Championships
1st  Scratch
1st  Madison (with Conor Leahy)
1st  Kilometer
 1st Team pursuit – Milton, UCI Nations Cup
 3rd  Team pursuit, Commonwealth Games

Road
2022
 2nd Criterium, National Under-23 Road Championships

References

External links
 

2000 births
Living people
Australian male cyclists
Australian track cyclists
21st-century Australian people
Cyclists at the 2022 Commonwealth Games
Commonwealth Games bronze medallists for Australia
Commonwealth Games medallists in cycling
Medallists at the 2022 Commonwealth Games
Cyclists from Brisbane